Petrophile fastigiata is a species of flowering plant in the family Proteaceae and is endemic to southwestern Western Australia. It is a shrub with pinnately-divided leaves with needle-shaped pinnae and sticky, oval heads of glabrous yellow to cream-coloured flowers.

Description
The flowers are arranged in sessile, sticky, oval heads with many overlapping, triangular involucral bracts at the base.

Taxonomy
Petrophile fastigiata was first formally described in 1810 by Robert Brown in the Transactions of the Linnean Society of London. The specific epithet (fastigiata) refers to the fastigiate, more or less erect leaves.

Distribution and habitat
This petrophile grows in scrub and low heath between Ravensthorpe and Mount Burdett near Esperance, in the Esperance Plains and Mallee biogeographical regions of southwestern Western Australia.

Conservation status
Petrophile fastigiata is classified as "not threatened" by the Western Australian Government Department of Parks and Wildlife.

References

fastigiata
Endemic flora of Western Australia
Eudicots of Western Australia
Plants described in 1810
Taxa named by Robert Brown (botanist, born 1773)